5/30/00 – London, England is a two-disc live album and the fifth in a series of 72 live bootlegs released by the American alternative rock band Pearl Jam from the band's 2000 Binaural Tour. It was released along with the other official bootlegs from the European leg of the tour on September 26, 2000.

Overview
The album was recorded on May 30, 2000, in London, England, at the world-famous live entertainment venue Wembley Arena. It was selected by the band as one of 18 "Ape/Man" shows from the tour, which, according to bassist Jeff Ament, were shows the band found "really exciting." Allmusic gave it three out of a possible five stars. Allmusic staff writer Steven Jacobetz said it is "the best show thus far on the tour five shows in. However, in the big picture, a concert which is not one of the best of the European tour and not essential." It debuted at number 137 on the Billboard 200 album chart.

Track listing

Personnel
Pearl Jam
Jeff Ament – bass guitar, design concept
Matt Cameron – drums
Stone Gossard – guitars
Mike McCready – guitars
Eddie Vedder – vocals, guitars

Production
John Burton – engineering
Brett Eliason – mixing
Brad Klausen – design and layout

Chart positions

References

Pearl Jam Official Bootlegs
2000 live albums
Epic Records live albums